Hanko may refer to

People 
August Hanko, German First World War flying ace

Places 
Hanko, Finland, town and municipality
Hanko Peninsula, Finland
Hankø, an island in the Oslo Fjord in Norway
The asteroid 2299 Hanko
Hanko, a misspelling of Hankou (汉口), China

Companies 
Hanko Sushi, a sushi restaurant chain founded in Hanko, Finland

Objects 
Hanko (stamp), a Japanese signature stamp

See also
Gangut (disambiguation), the Russian transliteration of Hangö udd
Hanco